The Łódź Zoo (Polish: Miejski Ogród Zoologiczny w Łodzi) is a zoological garden in the city of Łódź, Łódź Voivodeship in Poland. Established in 1938, it covers the area of 16,64 hectares in the district of Polesie and is home to 2,245 animals representing 667 species, including endangered Asiatic lions.

The zoo is a member of the European Association of Zoos and Aquaria, the World Association of Zoos and Aquariums and is also part of the International Species Information System.

History
The zoo was opened in 1938 in the Polesie district and covered the area of 8,9 hectares. In 1939, the zoo was in possession of only 50 animals such as deer, roe deer, fallow deer, ducks and sheep. The zoo emerged relatively unscathed after the Second World War and in 1945, many animals from other zoological gardens, most notably from the Wrocław Zoo, were transported to Łódź. In 1950, the area of the zoo was expanded and covered 16,64 ha. In the 1950s, the zoological garden developed more rapidly as more buildings and structures were constructed including the baboons enclosure. In 1968, the Big Cats' pavilion was opened and in 1988, to celebrate the 50th anniversary of the zoo, a pavilion for giraffes was constructed.

Since 1991, the zoo is part of the International Species Information System. In 2001, an enclosure for antelopes was built as well as new aviaries for owls and birds of prey. In 2011, a special pavilion showcasing the zoo's collection of butterflies was opened. In 2014, a pavilion housing small mammals such as binturongs, ring-tailed mongooses and Indian crested porcupines was built. In 2015, the construction of the Orientarium building started. It is the biggest investment in the history of the zoo and is expected to be opened in 2019. The whole complex will specifically feature the fauna of Southeast Asia and will house such animals as orangutans, surilis, clouded leopards and sharks.

The zoo's breeding program had a number of successes which include the births of southern cassowaries in 2014 and 2016, pied tamarin in 2014 and lynx in 2015.

Gallery

See also
Warsaw Zoo
Wrocław Zoo
Płock Zoo
Poznań Zoo
Kraków Zoo

References

Zoos in Poland
1938 establishments in Poland
Zoos established in 1938
Buildings and structures in Łódź